Agustín Carrera (born 13 June 1988) is an Argentine athlete specialising in the 110 metres hurdles. He won a bronze medal at the 2018 Ibero-American Championships.

His personal bests are 13.74 seconds in the 110 metres hurdles (+1.8 m/s, Buenos Aires 2014) and 7.89 in the 60 metres hurdles (São Caetano do Sul 2014). Both are current national records.

International competitions

References

1988 births
Living people
Argentine male hurdlers
Competitors at the 2013 Summer Universiade
Competitors at the 2015 Summer Universiade
Athletes (track and field) at the 2018 South American Games
21st-century Argentine people